Goat Island or Te Hāwere-a-Maki is a tiny island (approximately ) in New Zealand located close to the North Island coast, north of Auckland, northeast of Warkworth, and directly west of Little Barrier Island. It is within Cape Rodney-Okakari Point Marine Reserve, New Zealand's first marine reserve.

History

The island is spiritually significant to the local Māori tribe, Ngāti Manuhiri, because their ancestral waka (canoe), Moekākara, is said to have landed nearby.

The Cape Rodney-Okakari Point Marine Reserve was established in 1975, making Goat Island and the surrounding waters a protected area. As well as being in a marine reserve, Goat Island is a scenic reserve. The University of Auckland has a research facility at Goat Island known as the Leigh Marine Laboratory headed by Professor John Montgomery.  This will form the base for the University's new South Pacific Centre for Marine Science (SPCMS). Prime Minister Helen Clark launched the national and international campaign to raise funds for the SPCMS at Leigh on 21 June 2008.

Takangaroa – another island in the same area – was also once known as "Goat Island".

Flora and fauna
Goat Island and its surrounding area provide the habitat for the endemic beetle species Hyphalus wisei.

See also

 List of islands of New Zealand
 List of islands
 Desert island

References

Uninhabited islands of New Zealand
Islands of the Hauraki Gulf
Rodney Local Board Area
Marine reserves of New Zealand
Islands of the Auckland Region